Ulentuy (Ülente) is a rural locality (an ulus) in Zakamensky District, Republic of Buryatia, Russia. The population was 375 as of 2010. There are 5 streets.

Geography 
Ulentuy is located 22 km north of Zakamensk (the district's administrative centre) by road. Dutulur is the nearest rural locality.

References 

Rural localities in Zakamensky District